Health care districts are California special districts created to build and operate hospitals and other health care facilities and services in underserved areas. As of 2019, there are 79 health care districts in California. Each health care district is governed by a locally elected five-member board
of directors. Palomar Health in San Diego County is the largest district in California.

In 1945, the California Legislature passed the Local Hospital District Law which authorized the special districts. Most of the current health care districts were established in the first two decades thereafter.  In 1965, the Legislature passed the District Reorganization Act of 1965 which made changes to the law. In 1994, they were renamed as "health care districts", reflecting that health care was increasingly being provided outside of the hospital setting.

Powers and functions
Authority granted to health care districts includes:

 Operating health care facilities such as hospitals, clinics, skilled nursing facilities (SNF), adult day health centers, nurses' training school, and child care facilities.
 Operating ambulance services within and outside of the district.
 Operating programs that provide chemical dependency services, health education, wellness and prevention, rehabilitation, and aftercare.
 Carrying out activities through corporations, joint ventures, or partnerships.
 Establishing or participating in managed care.
 Contracting with and making grants to provider groups and clinics in the community.
 Other activities that are necessary for the maintenance of good physical and mental health in communities served by the district.

Community-based health districts

 Beach Cities Health District, Redondo Beach 
 Camarillo Health District, Camarillo 
 Corning Healthcare District, Corning
 Del Norte Healthcare District, Crescent City
 Desert Healthcare District, Palm Springs 
 Eden Township Healthcare District, Castro Valley 
 Fallbrook Healthcare District, Fallbrook 
 Grossmont Healthcare District, La Mesa 
 Los Medanos Community Healthcare District, Pittsburg 
 Marin Healthcare District, Greenbrae 
 Mark Twain Health Care District, San Andreas 
 Mount Diablo Healthcare District, Concord
 Palo Verde Health Care District, Blythe
 Peninsula Health Care District, Burlingame 
 Petaluma Health Care District, Petaluma 
 Redbud Health Care District, Clearlake 
 Sequoia Health Care District, Redwood City 
 West Side Healthcare District, Newman
 West Contra Costa Healthcare District

Rural districts operating hospitals

 Bear Valley Community Healthcare District, Big Bear Lake
 Chowchilla Memorial Hospital District, Chowchilla
 Coalinga Hospital District, Coalinga
 Corcoran Hospital District, Corcoran
 Eastern Plumas Healthcare District, Portola
 Hi-Desert Memorial Health Care District, Joshua Tree
 John C. Fremont Healthcare District, Mariposa
 Kern Valley Healthcare District, Lake Isabella 
 Kingsburg District Hospital, Kingsburg
 Lompoc Healthcare District, Lompoc 
 Mayers Memorial Hospital District, Fall River Mills
 Mendocino Coast Healthcare District, Fort Bragg
 North Sonoma County Hospital District, Healdsburg
 Northern Inyo county Local Hospital District, Bishop
 Oak Valley Hospital District, Oakdale
 Palm Drive Health Care District, Sebastopol
 Pioneers Memorial Healthcare District, Brawley
 Plumas District Hospital, Quincy
 San Benito Health Care District, Hollister
 San Bernardino Mountains Community Hospital District, Lake Arrowhead
 San Gorgonio Memorial Health Care District, Banning
 Seneca Healthcare District, Chester
 Sierra Kings Health Care District, Reedley
 Sierra View District Hospital, Porterville
 Sonoma Valley Health Care District, Sonoma
 Southern Humboldt Community Healthcare District, Garberville
 Southern Inyo Healthcare District, Lone Pine
 Southern Mono Healthcare District, Mammoth Lakes
 Surprise Valley Health Care District, Cedarville
 Tahoe Forest Hospital District, Truckee
 Tehachapi Valley Healthcare District, Tehachapi 
 Tulare District Healthcare System, Tulare

Non-rural district operating hospitals

 Antelope Valley Healthcare District, Lancaster 
 City of Alameda Health Care District, Alameda
  El Camino Hospital District, Mountain View 
 Heffernan Memorial Hospital District, Calexico
 Kaweah Delta Health Care District, Visalia 
 Palomar Health, San Diego County
 Salinas Valley Memorial Healthcare System, Salinas
 Tri-City Healthcare District, Oceanside
 Valley Health System, Hemet
 Washington Township Health Care District, Fremont

Districts operating skilled-nursing facilities
 North Kern South Tulare Hospital District, Delano
 Soledad Community Health Care District, Soledad 
 Eastern Plumas Health Care District, Portola, CA
 Mountain Communities Healthcare District, Trinity Hospital, Weaverville, CA
 Bear Valley Community Healthcare District, Big Bear Lake, CA
 Kern Valley Healthcare District, Lake Isabella, CA
 Southern Humboldt Community Healthcare District, Jerold Phelps Community Hospital SNF, Garberville CA

Districts operating ambulances
 Cambria Community Health District, Cambria 
 Cloverdale Health Care District, Cloverdale
 Del Puerto Health Care District, Patterson
 Muroc Healthcare District, Boron
 Oak Valley Hospital District, Oakdale
 West Side Community Healthcare District, Newman
 Eastern Plumas Healthcare District, Portola, CA

Districts operating clinics
 Bloss Memorial Healthcare District, Atwater 
 Del Puerto Health Care District, Patterson
 Mendocino Coast Healthcare District, Fort Bragg 
 Soledad Community Health Care District, Soledad 
 Kern Valley Healthcare District; Mountain View Health Center, Mountain Mesa
 Southern Humboldt Community Healthcare District, SoHum Health Community Clinic, Garberville

See also
 Local government in California

References

Further reading

External links
 Local Health Care District Law in the California Health and Safety Code
Association of California Healthcare Districts

Local government in California
Special districts of California
Health departments in California